Behnam Abolghasempour (born August 24, 1973) is an Iranian retired football player. He has played for four Iranian clubs including Saipa, Persepolis, Pas and Sorkhpoushan. He has also represented the Iran national football team four times, scoring twice. He is currently sporting director at Rah Ahan.

Club career statistics

References

Behnam Abolghasempour at teammelli.com
Jamejam
goal.com
Pana

1973 births
Living people
People from Ray, Iran
Iranian footballers
Iran international footballers
Persepolis F.C. players
Azadegan League players
Association football forwards